John Sappington (October 1847 – February 10, 1905) was a physician and politician from Maryland. He served in the Maryland Senate from 1886 to 1888.

Early life
John Sappington was born in October 1847 in Darlington, Maryland, to Mary (née O'Neal) and John Sappington. He attended the Elkton Academy and graduated from an academy in Norwalk, Connecticut, in 1865. He attended the University of Virginia and started to study medicine. He graduated from Jefferson Medical College in 1868.

Career
Sappington was a Democrat. He was elected to the Maryland Senate in 1885. He served from 1886 to 1888, representing Harford County.

Sappington worked as a physician and had a medical practice.

Personal life
Sappington married Mary P. Hays in 1874. They had three sons, Walter Hays, William F. and Earl (or Earle) Neilson. He later married Rosa Jacobs of Bel Air. Sappington was a Episcopalian.

Sappington had a stroke in July 1904. He died on February 10, 1905.

References

External link

Maryland State Archives: John Sappington

1847 births
1905 deaths
People from Darlington, Maryland
Jefferson Medical College alumni
Democratic Party Maryland state senators
Physicians from Maryland
Episcopalians from Maryland